Several scholars of nationalism support the existence of nationalism in the Middle Ages (mainly in Europe). This school of thought differs from modernism, which suggests that nationalism developed after the late 18th century and the French Revolution. Theories on the existence of nationalism in the Middle Ages may belong to the general paradigms of ethnosymbolism and primordialism (perennialism).

Western and Northern Europe 

The belief that Christian universality in the medieval West supposedly prevented the evolution of national identities, was first challenged by scholars like John Huizinga (1920–2008), historian Marc Bloch (1886–1944), Hugh Seton-Watson (1916–1984), Vivian Galbraith (1889–1976), and others, whose works suggested that research on nationalism should be extended back to the Middle Ages. 

Among the modern authors who advocate the origin of nations in the Middle Ages is Adrian Hastings (1929–2001). His seminal work is "The Construction of Nationhood: Ethnicity, Religion and Nationalism" (1997), based on a series of lectures given in 1996 at Queen's University, Belfast. Hastings criticizes the modernist theory of Eric Hobsbawm, Ernest Gellner, John Breuilly, and Benedict Anderson, and argues that religion is central to the creation of nations and nationalism. In his view, England is considered the oldest example of a mature nation, and the development of nations is closely linked to the Christian Church and the spread of written popular languages to existing ethnic groups. Other authors trace the origins of nationalism and the national consciousness of England and some European nations soon after the Middle Ages, in the 16th century. Hastings argues that what allowed the emergence of nationalism was the spread of the ability to write and read.

For many non-modernists, nations have emerged from the Judeo-Christian tradition. John Alexander Armstrong (1922–2010) was one of the first modern scholars to argue that nations have pre-modern roots and that their formation was helped by religious institutions locally. In the same vein, other anti-modernist studies by Hastings, Anthony D. Smith, and Steven Grosby attributed nationalism on the Judeo-Christian traditions. Hastings emphasizes the role of language, and sees the opposition of Christianity to Islam as a critical factor in the formation of nationalism. He also considers as an important factor in ethnogenesis in the Western Europe the conviction of being a chosen people, which was further strengthened by the tension between Catholicism and Protestantism.

Azar Gat (who claims that the Jewish nation has existed since antiquity) claims (contra Anderson) that the creation of imagined communities was made possible not only by secularization and the rise of print capitalism in modern era, but could also be produced earlier by the spoken word and via religious rituals. Gat does not agree with the modernist view that pre-modern multi-ethnic empires were ruled by an elite indifferent to the ethnic composition of its subjects. In fact, almost all of the empires were based on a dominant ethnic core, while most ethnic communities were too small and weak to have their own independent state.

According to the historian Caspar Hirschi, it is the concept of nations and nationalism that changes over time, and the 18th century is only the beginning of the modernist model of this concept. In his work "The Origins of Nationalism", Hirschi presents the evolution of nationalism since the 14th century. In his view, nationalism was born in Catholic Medieval Europe and was the consequence of Roman imperialism. According to Hirschi, nationalism is not necessarily a mass phenomenon (as modernists believe) but can be the discourse of nationalist elite minorities. Other scholars, such as Doron Mendels, Steven Grosby, and Aviel Roshwald, argue for the rise of a kind of nationalism among the ancient Jews. David M. Goodblatt supports the same theory, pointing out that Jewish nationalism appears in the self-description of the Jews of the Second Temple period (5th–1st century BC).

Sverre Bagge investigates the origins of Norwegian nationalism from the gradual "unification of the kingdom" in the 9th century, which led to the formation of the Norwegian, Danish and Swedish kingdoms. A kind of Norwegian state existed by the 13th century, with public justice, taxation, a common military organization and royalty. By the 12th and 13th century, a popular saga literature was widespread (oral and written), expressing national patriotic sentiments. A significant part of the population was loyal to the king and identified their interests with his. Bagge believes that in the case of Norway, between nationalism in the Middle Ages and in the modern period there is a difference of degree rather than a difference of quality.

Prof. Sahan Karatasli examined the various forms of collective identity in Northern Italy from the 11th to 16th century, and he believes that in the mid-12th century, city-states formed civic nationalism. At that period, the communes of the cities incorporated their countryside (contado) and acquired a territorial existence. This process created internal social divisions and rivalries, which was the reason for the invention of new forms of  bonds between social groups and between state and subjects. Older practices like the ecclesiastical boundaries (diocese) were utilized, which unified the city and the countryside. New symbols and myths and "invented traditions" were also created. A notable "invented tradition" was the new cults of patron-saints, like Saint Ansano of Siena, St.  Alexander patron of Bergamo, St. Petronio, patron of the Bologna etc. Most of these "new" saints were local people (including many laywomen) from humble backgrounds that ordinary people could easily associate with themselves, and were promoted not by ecclesiastical powers but by urban laity (i.e. communal governments). Civic rituals and festivals associated with these saints that emphasized the unity of the commune or the city-state were established. The image of the saint-patron was seen as a sign and the guarantee of the unity between the city and the contado.

Eastern Orthodox Church, Byzantium, Slavs and Greeks 

Dimitri Obolensky considers that the Orthodox Slavs in Eastern Europe and Balkans (Russians, Bulgarians and Serbs) had nationalism and a national consciousness during the Middle Ages. This nationalism was mobilized by their dissatisfaction with the imperialism of the Byzantines, especially in ecclesiastical matters, such as the appointment of bishops by the Patriarch of Constantinople. From a positive point of view, the Patriarch helped the creation of national consciousness by establishing ecclesiastical districts in Slavic areas. This also happened with other non-Slavic Orthodox peoples, as the dioceses of Wallachia and Moldavia, two Romanian states, were founded in 1359 and in 1401, respectively. The Patriarchate from time to time made such concessions to other Slavic Christian populations, such as granting autocephaly to the Churches of Bulgaria and Serbia, or appointing ethnic Russians as Metropolitans of Kiev.

Some scholars believe that the roots of modern Greek nationalism dates back to the Middle Ages, especially between the 13th and mid-15th centuries. In this view, the event that led to the development of modern Greek national consciousness was the conflict with the Fourth Crusade and subsequent Frankish rule. Modern Greek nationalism rises after the conquest of Constantinople in 1204 and the creation of the despotates which succeeded the Byzantine Empire, especially in Epirus, Nicaea, and Morea. At that time, the term Hellene ("Greek") revived – having been previously discredited as a synonym for "pagan" – and was used in parallel with "Roman". Stephen G. Xydis uses the term proto-nationalism for the emergence of the modern Greek national identity in late Byzantium.

John Alexander Armstrong (1922–2010) refers to a "premature nationalism" of this Byzantine period, based on a sense of God's choice and protection in an age of adversities. As "true Israel", the Orthodox Church and the community enjoyed God's favor, while priests and the people fought against the "heretical" Latins and the "unfaithful" Turks.

According to Michel Boucard the Eastern Orthodox world had a long tradition of biblical translation to national languages since the 2nd century. Orthodoxy and the Ecumenical Patriarchate of Constantinople facilitated the formation of national autonomous Orthodox Churches, by producing national alphabets like the Early Cyrillic alphabet. Through an analysis of a 14th-century religious text, he demonstrates that there was a clear sense of Russian nationhood. He proposed that these old religious texts demonstrate the need to revise some assumptions concerning the presumed modern nature of nationhood. In an earlier work, Bouchard traces the Russian national consciousness in the 11th century, as it is reflected in religious texts such as Slavic psalms and apocrypha. According to Richard J. Crampton, the development of Old Church Slavonic literacy during the 10th century had the effect of preventing the assimilation of the Eastern South Slavs into the Byzantine culture, which promoted the formation of a distinct Bulgarian identity.

References

Further reading
Hagen Schulze, States, Nations and Nationalism: From the Middle Ages to the Present, March 1998, Wiley-Blackwell, 392 Pages. 
Boucard Michel, "A critical reappraisal of the concept of the 'Imagined Community' and the presumed sacred languages of the medieval period", National Identities, Vol. 6, 2004 - Issue 1. Abstract
Michel Bouchard, The Medieval Nation of Rus': Τhe Religious Underpinnings of the Russian Nation, Ab Imperio, 3/2001, pp. 97–122. Abstract in Russian
Claire Weeda, "Ethnic Identification and Stereotypes in Western Europe, circa 1100-1300.", History Compass 12/7 (2014): 586–606, 10.1111/hic3.12174

 
Theories of history
Historiography of the Middle Ages
Historiography of Europe
Medieval politics
History of ideologies